The following is a list of notable Afghan people, which includes all the ethnic groups of the modern state of Afghanistan. Afghanistan has gone through territorial changes. This list generally excludes Ethnic Pashtuns who originate from regions that were not controlled by Afghanistan at the time, though there are exceptions for certain figures who are prominent to Pashtuns. It also includes historical figures coming from the present day borders of Afghanistan, even if they were non-Pashtuns.

Monarchs
 

Humayun (reigned 26 December 1530 – 17 May 1540) Second Mughal emperor
Demetrius I of Bactria (c. 200 – c. 180 BCE) King of Bactria
Eucratides I (reigned 171–145 BC) King of the Bactrian Empire
Menander I (reigned 165/155–130 BC) Indo-Greek king
Mahmud of Ghazni (reigned 998 – 30 April 1030) Sultan of the Ghaznavid Empire
Ghiyath al-Din Muhammad (reigned 1163 – 11 February 1203) Sultan of the Ghurid Empire
Muhammad of Ghor (reigned 1173–1202) Sultan of the Ghurid Sultanate
Muhammad Shah (reigned 27 September 1719 – 26 April 1748) 13th Mughal Emperor
Abu Sa'id Mirza (reigned Samarkand: 1451–1469,Herat: 1459–1469) Ruler of the Timurd empire
Alauddin Khalji (reigned 19 July 1296 – 4 January 1316) Turco-Afghan Ruler of Delhi Sultanate
Ulugh Beg II (reign 1461–1502) Timiurd Ruler of Kabul and Ghazni
Abul-Qasim Babur Mirza Timiurd Ruler of khorasan
Sher Shah Suri (1537 – 22 May 1545) Founder of the Suri Empire in India,
Sultan Husayn Bayqara (reigned 1469  – 4 May 1506) Amir of the Timurid Empire
Ahmad Shah Durrani (1747–1772) was the founder of the Durrani Empire and is regarded by some (though there is no historical record) as the founder of the modern state of Afghanistan
Jalal-ud-din Khalji (reigned 13 June 1290 - 19 July 1296) Founder of the Khalji dynasty, 12th Ruler of the Delhi Sultanate

Presidents

 
 Daoud Khan
 Nur Muhammad Taraki 
 Mohammad Najibullah
 Burhanuddin Rabbani
 Hamid Karzai
 Ashraf Ghani-served as the fifth president of Afghanistan,and as the second and final president of the Islamic Republic of Afghanistan.

Politicians and diplomats

 Mohammad Siddiq Chakari
 Abdul Ahmad Zahedi Niqala
 Wahid Omar
 Amrullah Saleh the second Panjshir resistance
 Rafael Pinhasi Israeli politician
 Mahmud Tarzi Afghan politician and intellectual, known as founder of Afghan journalism
 Mohammad Ibraheem Khwakhuzhi
 Zalmay Khalilzad Afghan-American diplomat and foreign policy expert
 Rangin Dadfar Spanta
 Gulbuddin Hekmatyar
 Ali Ahmad Khan Afghan politician and self proclaimed Emir of Afghanistan for a few weeks
 Ismael Balkhi Hazara political leader and reformist
 Abdul Rahman Pazhwak diplomat, scholar and poet
 Abdul Qadir (Afghan communist) Afghan politician, diplomat, and military officer
 Mohammed Aziz Khan Afghan prince and diplomat
 Abdur Rahim Khan (governor) Afghan governor of Herat
 Abdul Rashid Dostum Afghan warlord
 Juma Khan Hamdard governor of Paktia Province from 2007 to 2015
 Al-Sari ibn al-Hakam(died November 820) served twice as the Abbasid Caliphate's governor of Egypt.
 Sayed Mohammad Ali Jawid Afghan politician
 Khairullah Khairkhwa current Afghan Minister of Information and Culture and a former Minister of the Interior. 
 Kubra Noorzai Afghan politician. She was the first woman to become a government minister in the country.
 Nasima Razmyar Afghan-Finnish politician, elected to the Finnish Parliament in 2015
 Mohammad Nabi Omari Afghan politician, governor of Khost province and held for nearly twelve years in extrajudicial detention in the United States Guantanamo Bay
 Abdul Ali Mazari political leader of the Hezb-e Wahdat party
 Ahmad ibn Nizam al-Mulk born in Balkh, Persian vizier of the Seljuq Empire and then the Abbasid Caliphate.
 Shah Mahmud Khan Prime Minister of Afghanistan from May 1946 to 7 September 1953, under King Mohammed Zahir Shah's monarchy
 Abdul Hadi Dawi Afghan poet, diplomat and government official.

Military figures
Kamal al-Din Gurg (died late 1315 or early 1316), general of the Delhi Sultanate ruler Alauddin Khalji.
Adham Khan general of Akbar the Great, third Mughal empire
Mullah Omar Mujahideen leader, co-founder of the Taliban and served as its first leader
Ahmad Shah Massoud military commander
Jalaluddin Haqqani Afghan insurgent commander who founded the Haqqani network
Ala al-Dawla Mirza Timurid prince and a grandson of the Central Asian ruler Shah Rukh
Bairam Khan military commander and commander-in-chief of the Mughal army
Wazir Akbar Khan Afghan prince, general and Emir
Habibullāh Kalakāni leader of the Saqqawists
Abdul Qadir (Afghan communist) military officer in the Afghan Air Force
Commander Shafi Hazara ethnic Hazara military commander in Afghanistan
Kabir Andarabi military official
Abdul Rasul Sayyaf Mujahideen commander
Dadullah Taliban's senior military commander in Afghanistan until his death in 2007
Obaidullah Akhund Defence Minister in the Afghan Taliban government of 1996–2001 
Amin Wardak major Afghan Mujahideen leader
Abdul Raziq Achakzai Afghan Army Lieutenant General and Police Chief, considered to be one of the most powerful security officials in Afghanistan for the last few years of his life
Tahir ibn Husayn General and Governor of Khurasan during the Abbasid caliphate
Masrur al-Balkhi senior military officer in the late-9th century Abbasid Caliphate
Azad Khan Afghan military commander
Sardar Shah Wali Khan political and military figure in Afghanistan
Mohammad Akram, vice Chief of Staff of the Afghan National Army; died in a suicide attack in 2005.

Scientists

 Jamal ad-Din al-Afghani philosopher
 Hedayat Amin Arsala economist
 Mohammad Amin Fatemi physician
 Nake M. Kamrany professor of economics
 Habib Mangal physician
 Abdul Ahad Mohmand astronaut, he became the first Afghan citizen and the fourth Muslim to visit outer space, he also made Pashto the 4th spoken language in space.
 Abdul Karim Mustaghni
 M. Ishaq Nadiri professor of economics
 Ghulam Faroq Nijrabi physician
 Abbas Noyan engineer
 Hamidullah Qalandarzai engineer
 Mohammad Qayoumi engineer; president of San Jose State University
 Daud Shah Saba geologist
 Sima Samar physician
 Habiba Sarobi hematologist
 Nazif Shahrani professor of anthropology
 Kabir Stori psychologist
 Zemaryalai Tarzi archeologist
 Abdul Qayum Tutakhail physician
 Ghulam Sediq Wardak inventor
 Abu Ma'shar al-Balkhi astrologer
 Abu Zayd al-Balkhi (850–934) – geographer and mathematician
 Al-Muqanna chemist, also known for leading an Islamic revolt and claiming to be a prophet
 Al-Sijzi Muslim astronomer, mathematician, and astrologer

Entrepreneurs

 Fahim Hashimy
 Safi Rauf
 Fatema Akbari
 Ehsan Bayat
 Sherkhan Farnood
 Fauzia Gailani, Gilani ethnic Pashtun
 Mahmud Karzai
 Roya Mahboob
 Sher Khan Nashir
 Saad Mohseni

Historians

 Abu Mansour al-Hosein ibn Muhammad al-Marghani
 Hamid Naweed
 Akram Assem
 Ghulam Mohammad Ghobar (1898–1978)
 Zalmay A. Gulzad
 Abdul Hai Habibi (1910–1984)
 Faiz Mohammad Katib Hazara
 Omara Khan Massoudi geographer, historian
 Abdul Shakoor Rashad (1921–2004)
 Abd al-Razzaq Samarqandi – chronicler and Islamic scholar
 Khvandamir
 Mohammad Rauf Mehdi

Media people (including actors and film directors)

 Josh Gadactor, known for voicing Olaf in Frozen
 Latif Ahmadi director of Afghan Film, Afghanistan's state-run film company
 Leena Alam actress
 Siddiq Barmak (born 1962) directed the drama film Osama (2003)
 Abdul Ghafoor Breshna painter, music composer, poet and film director
 Sonia Nassery Cole directed the drama film The Black Tulip (2010)
 Zohre Esmaeli (born 1985) model, author, designer
 Fahim Fazli actor, author, modification speaker, cultural technical advisor for US Marines
 Azita Ghanizada
 Marina Golbahari
 Nelufar Hedayat
 Haji Kamran
 Kader Khan
 Ahmed Latif
 Ahmad Khan Mahmidzada
 Mamnoon Maqsoodi (born 1966)
 Anisa Wahab
 Abdul Wahid Nazari (born 1953)
 Nelofer Pazira
 Dr. Hafiz Sahar (1928–1982)
 Soosan Firooz
 Yalda Hakim 
 Atiq Rahimi – French-Afghan filmmaker, writer

Writers (including journalists)

Mohammad Jan Fana (born 1932)
Nelufar Hedayat 
Khaled Hosseini (born 1965)
Hafizullah Khaled
Qiamuddin Khadim
Sultan Munadi (1976–2009)
Fariba Nawa (born 1973)
Nelofer Pazira
Dr. Hafiz Sahar (1928–1982)
Sayed Ihsanuddin Taheri
Mahmud Tarzi (1865–1933)
Sakena Yacoobi
Rahnaward Zaryab
Ahmad Javeed Ahwar
Tamim Ansary 
Homeira Qaderi
Gul Mohamad Zhowandai
Leila Christine Nadir 
Abu Ubaid al-Qasim bin Salam (770–838)  philologist and the author of many standard works on lexicography, Qur’anic sciences, 
Abu Mansur al-Azhari (895-980)  lexicographer, philologist and grammarian of Arabic. Prominent Philogist of his time.
Abdul Khaliq Hussaini journalist, activist
Aziz Ullah Haidari journalist
Chékéba Hachemi Afghan feminist and writer
Mohammad Haider Zhobal history writer

Poets

 Jalāl ad-Dīn Mohammad Rūmī the great Sufi mystic and poet of 13th century
 Khwaja Abdullah Ansari
 Hafizullah Khaled
 Hamza Baba (1907–1994) Sage of Herat, the great Sufi mystic of 11th century
 Rahman Baba (1650–1715)
 Wasef Bakhtari
 Khalilullah Khalili (1907–1987)
 Ghani Khan (1914–1996)
 Khushal Khan Khattak (1613–1689)
 Latif Nazemi (born 1947)
 Parween Pazhwak (born 1967)
 Pir Roshan (1525–1582/1585)
 Sana Safi
 Layla Sarahat Rushani (died 2004)
 Hakim Sanai (1080–1131)
 Kabir Stori (1942–2006)
 Mahmūd Tarzī (1830–1900)
 Nazo Tokhi
 Qahar Asi (1956–1994)
 Wasef Bakhtari
 Mohammad Hashem Zamani
 Rabia Balkhi from the city of Balkh, possibly the first female poet of Persian literature
 Abu al-Fath al-Busti (942–1010)
 Abdul Bari Jahani Afghan poet, most notable work is the national anthem of the Islamic Republic of Afghanistan
 Makhfi Badakhshi
 Nadia Anjuman 
 Abdul Rahman Pazhwak (1919–1995)
 Ali-Shir Nava'i (1441–1501) poet, writer, politician, linguist, mystic and painter
 Unsuri 10-11th century Persian poet, from Balkh
 Matiullah Turab

Artists

 Dust Muhammad born in Herat, Persian painter of miniatures, calligrapher, and art historian. Disciple of Kamāl ud-Dīn Behzād
 Kamāl ud-Dīn Behzād (1455–1535), painter
 Ali-Shir Nava'i (1441–1501)
 Mariam Ghani visual artist, photographer, filmmaker 
 Lida Abdul video artist and performance artist 
 Malina Suliman graffiti artist, metalworker, and painter
 Abdul Ghafoor Breshna one of Afghanistan's most talented artists
 Shamsia Hassani graffiti artist, a fine arts lecturer, and the associate professor of Drawing and Anatomy Drawing at the Kabul University

Religious figures
Ibrahim ibn Adhamearly ascetic Sufi saint
Asif MohseniAfghan Twelver Shi'a Marja'
Muqatil ibn Sulayman scholar of Islam, wrote earliest, possibly first commentaries of the Quran
Hiwi al-Balkhi 9th century exegete and critic of the bible
Ali Hujwiri 11th-century sunni Muslim mystic, theologian and preacher.
Shahid Balkhi Persian theologian, philosopher, poet and Sufi. Famous Persian poet Rudaki has a poem in Balkhi's elegy.
Ali al-Qari Islamic scholar
Haji Dost Muhammad Qandhari Afghan Sufi master
Sheikh Mohammad Rohani Sufi cleric born around 1220 AD
Abobaker Mojadidi spiritual Muslim leader and socio-political activist 
Ahmed Gailani was the leader of the Qadiriyyah Sufi order in Afghanistan
Mirza Muhammad Ismail Afghan religious scholar and the first convert to the Ahmadiyya faith
Sultan Balkhi 14th century Muslim saint, known for preaching Islam in Bengal
Ibn Hibban scholar, Muhaddith, historian and author of well-known works

Sportspeople 

 Rashid Khan cricketer, the ICC Men's T20I Player of the Decade
Mohammad Nabi – cricketer, 1st in Allrounder rankings.
Mujeeb Ur Rahman – cricketer
Hamid Hassan – cricketer
Hazratullah Zazai – cricketer, led Afghanistan to the highest T20I score of 278/3
Rahmanullah Gurbaz – cricketer
Qais Ahmad – cricketer
Asghar Afghan – cricketer, Afghanistan's former captain and ended his career with the highest T20I wins as a captain.
 Rohullah Nikpai – first Afghanistan's Taekwondo Olympic winner of 2008 and 2012
 Mustafa Amini Afghan-Australian footballer
 Javed Ahmadi cricketer
 Sandjar Ahmadi footballer
 Raees Ahmadzai cricketer
 Yamin Ahmadzai cricketer
 Shamsuddin Amiri footballer
 Jan Alam Hassani volleyballer
 Qaher Hazrat cyclist
 Basir Kamrani footballer
 Qais Khedri footballer 
 Gulbadin Naib cricketer
 Nasratullah Nasrat cricketer
 Said Karimulla Khalili Russian-Afghan biathlete
 Ahmad Nasir Safi footballer
 Dawlat Zadran cricketer
Siyar Bahadurzada UFC fighter
 Nadia Nadim footballer
 Jeff Bronkey Afghan-American former Major League Baseball pitcher 
 Shamila Kohestani footballer, and former captain of the Afghanistan women's national football team
 Hussain Sadiqi Afghan Australian martial artist
 Khaleqdaad Noori cricketer
 Moshtagh Yaghoubi Afghan-born Finnish footballer

Musicians (including composers)

 Omar Akram Grammy Award-winning Afghan-American recording artist, composer and pianist
 Aryana Sayeed
 Naghma
 Dawood Sarkhosh
 Farhad Darya
 Soosan Firooz actress and rapper
 Mozhdah Jamalzadah
 Miri Maftun
 Latif Nangarhari
 Nasrat Parsa
 Ahmad Zahir
 Hangama
 Ahmad Wali
 Ubaidullah Jan – Pashto singer
 Nashenas – one of the oldest surviving musicians from Afghanistan
 Rukhshana – one of the first Afghan female singers
 Rahim Bakhsh 
 Abdul Rahim Sarban – singer
 Nainawaz – artist, poet and composer; composed some of the most iconic pieces in Afghan popular music

Female activists

 Sima Samar human rights, democracy, first Afghan's Noble award candidate
 Aryana Sayeed women's rights activist and famous singer 
 Roqia Abubakr
 Sitara Achakzai women's rights activist
 Jamila Afghani founder of Noor Educational and Capacity Development Organization (NECDO)
 Safia Ahmed-jan women's rights activist
 Khadija Ahrari helped give women the right to vote
 Fatema Akbari
 Farida Azizi advocate for peace and women's rights.
 Marzia Basel advocate for women's education
 Mariam Ghani artist and advocate for women's rights
 Laila Haidari (born 1978)
 Malalai Joya (born 1978)
 Fawzia Koofi 
 Anahita Ratebzad (1931–2014)
 Masuma Esmati Wardak
 Manizha Wafeq
 Asila Wardak

Others

 Safi Rauf (born 1994)
 Ahmad Massoud (born 1989)
 Sharbat Gula (born 1972)
 Mir Masjidi Khan (died 1841) Afghan resistance leader
 Youssof Kohzad writer, painter, playwright, artist, poet and actor
 Abdul Majid Zabuli (1896–1998) founder of Bank-e-Melli Afghanistan
 Zallascht Sadat model
 Vida Samadzai model
 Bahari Ibaadat model
 Khwaja Usman Mughal opponent, Baro-Bhuyan chieftain 
 Abdul Latif Pedram professor of literature
 Azizullah Royesh social activist 
 Al-Farabi (872–950) – early Islamic philosopher and polymath; Also known as Alpharabius in the west
 Razia Muradi (born 1995 or 1996) academic
 Abdul Khaliq Hazara assassin
 Ghulam Muhammad Tarzi soldier, poet, and military leader
 Nur Jahan Empress consort of Mughal Empire
 Khalid ibn Barmak born in Balkh, 8th century Soldier and administrator 
 Robert Joffrey born Anver Bey Abdullah Jaffa Khan to Afghan father and Italian mother; choreographer, dancer, director
 Afghana tribal chief or prince of Pashtuns, traditionally considered the progenitor of modern-day Pashtuns.
 Yoram Cohen born to Afghan Jewish parents, director of Israel's internal security service "Shin Bet"
 Zablon Simintov Afghan Jewish carpet trader and restaurateur; widely known for being thought as the last Jew remaining in Afghanistan
 Malalai of Maiwand national folk hero of Afghanistan also known as "Afghan Jeanne d'Arc"; rallied the Pashtun fighters to fight against the British invaders in the Battle of Maiwand causing an Afghan victory
 Trapusa and Bahalika first two lay disciples of the Buddha
 Durkhanai Ayubi Afghan-Australian food expert, restaurateur, and prize-winning cookbook author 
 Mohammad Sharif Razai medical doctor and researcher
 Roxana princess that Alexander the Great married, either born in Bactria (Balkh) or Sogodia
 Faiz Ahmad Marxist–Leninist Afghan revolutionary and the founding leader of the Afghanistan Liberation Organization (ALO)
 Baysunghur prince from the house of Timurids

See also

 Demographics of Afghanistan
 Lists of people by nationality
List of Hazara people
 List of Pashtuns
 List of Tajik people

References